This is a list of butterfly species and subspecies found in West Bengal, India.

Family: Papilionidae

Subfamily: Papilioninae 
Tribe: Leptocircini

Genus: Graphium (swordtails, bluebottles and jays)

Species: Graphium agamemnon (tailed jay) 
Subspecies: Graphium agamemnon agamemnon (Oriental tailed jay)

Species: Graphium agetes (four-bar swordtail) 
Subspecies: Graphium agetes agetes (Assam four-bar swordtail)

Species: Graphium antiphates (five-bar swordtail) 
Subspecies: Graphium antiphates pompilius (Indo-Chinese five-bar swordtail)

Species: Graphium aristeus (chain swordtail) 
Subspecies: Graphium aristeus anticrates (Assam chain swordtail)

Species: Graphium cloanthus (glassy bluebottle) 
Subspecies: Graphium cloanthus cloanthus (Himalayan glassy bluebottle)

Species: Graphium doson (common jay) 
Subspecies: Graphium doson axionides (Himalayan common jay)

Species: Graphium macareus (lesser zebra) 
Subspecies: Graphium macareus indicus (east Himalayan lesser zebra)

Species: Graphium nomius (spot swordtail) 
Subspecies: Graphium nomius nomius (Indian spot swordtail)

Species: Graphium sarpedon (common bluebottle) 
Subspecies: Graphium sarpedon sarpedon (Oriental common bluebottle)

Tribe: Papilionini

Genus: Papilio (swallowtails, mimes)

Species: Papilio alcmenor (redbreast) 
Subspecies: Papilio alcmenor alcmenor (Khasi redbreast)

Species: Papilio bianor (common peacock) 
Subspecies: Papilio bianor ganesa (east Himalayan common peacock)

Species: Papilio castor (common raven) 
Subspecies: Papilio castor polias (Himalayan common raven)

Species: Papilio clytia (common mime) 
Subspecies: Papilio clytia clytia (Oriental common mime)

Species: Papilio crino (common banded peacock)

Species: Papilio demoleus (lime swallowtail) 
Subspecies: Papilio demoleus demoleus (northern lime swallowtail or lime butterfly)

Species: Papilio epycides (lesser mime) 
Subspecies: Papilio epycides epycides (Himalayan lesser mime)

Species: Papilio memnon (great Mormon) 
Subspecies: Papilio memnon agenor (continental great Mormon)

Species: Papilio nephelus (yellow Helen) 
Subspecies: Papilio nephelus chaon (Khasi yellow Helen)

Species: Papilio paris (Paris peacock) 
Subspecies: Papilio paris paris (Chinese Paris peacock)

Species: Papilio polymnestor (blue Mormon) 
Subspecies: Papilio polymnestor polymnestor (Indian blue Mormon)

Species: Papilio polytes (common Mormon) 
Subspecies: Papilio polytes romulus (Indian common Mormon)

Species: Papilio protenor (spangle) 
Subspecies: Papilio protenor euprotenor (Himalayan spangle)

Tribe: Teinopalpini

Genus: Meandrusa

Species: Meandrusa payeni (yellow gorgon) 
Subspecies: Meandrusa payeni evan (Sikkim yellow gorgon)

Tribe: Troidini

Genus: Atrophaneura

Species: Atrophaneura polyeuctes (common windmill) 
Subspecies: Atrophaneura polyeuctes polyeuctes (Sylhet common windmill)

Genus: Pachliopta

Species: Pachliopta aristolochiae (common rose) 
Subspecies: Pachliopta aristolochiae aristolochiae (Indian common rose)

Genus: Troides

Species: Troides helena (common birdwing) 
Subspecies: Troides helena cerberus (Khasi common birdwing)

Family: Pieridae

Subfamily: Coliadinae

Genus: Catopsilia (emigrants)

Species: Catopsilia pomona (lemon emigrant or common emigrant) 
Subspecies: Catopsilia pomona pomona (Oriental lemon emigrant)

Species: Catopsilia pyranthe (mottled emigrant) 
Subspecies: Catopsilia pyranthe pyranthe (Oriental mottled emigrant)

Genus: Eurema (grass yellows)

Species: Eurema andersonii (one-spot grass yellow) 
Subspecies: Eurema andersonii jordani (Sikkim one-spot grass yellow or Jordan's grass yellow)

Species: Eurema hecabe (common grass yellow) 
Subspecies: Eurema hecabe hecabe (Oriental common grass yellow)

Genus: Gandaca

Species: Gandaca harina (tree yellow) 
Subspecies: Gandaca harina assamica (Assam tree yellow)

Subfamily: Pierinae 
Tribe: Anthocharidini

Genus: Hebomoia

Species: Hebomoia glaucippe (great orange-tip) 
 Subspecies: Hebomoia glaucippe glaucippe (Oriental great orange-tip)

Tribe: Leptosiaini

Genus: Leptosia

Species: Leptosia nina (psyche) 
 Subspecies: Leptosia nina nina (Oriental psyche)

Tribe: Pierini

Genus: Appias

Species: Appias albina (common albatross) 
 Subspecies: Appias albina darada (Sylhet common albatross)

Species: Appias lalage (spot puffin) 
 Subspecies: Appias lalage lalage (Himalayan spot puffin)

Species: Appias libythea (western striped albatross)

Species: Appias lyncida (chocolate albatross) 
 Subspecies: Appias lyncida eleonora (Indo-Chinese chocolate albatross)

Genus: Delias (Jezebels)

Species: Delias acalis (redbreast Jezebel) 
 Subspecies: Delias acalis pyramus (Himalayan redbreast Jezebel)

Species: Delias agostina (yellow Jezebel) 
 Subspecies: Delias agostina agostina (Sikkim yellow Jezebel)

Species: Delias belladonna (hill Jezebel) 
 Subspecies: Delias belladonna ithiela (Sikkim hill Jezebel)

Species: Delias descombesi (red-spot Jezebel) 
 Subspecies: Delias descombesi descombesi (Vietnamese red-spot Jezebel)

Species: Delias eucharis (Indian Jezebel)

Species: Delias hyparete (painted Jezebel) 
 Subspecies: Delias hyparete indica (Indian painted Jezebel)

Species: Delias pasithoe (red-base Jezebel) 
 Subspecies: Delias pasithoe pasithoe (Chinese red-base Jezebel)

Genus: Prioneris

Species: Prioneris philonome (redspot sawtooth) 
 Subspecies: Prioneris philonome clemanthe (Myanmarese redspot sawtooth)

Species: Prioneris thestylis (spotted sawtooth) 
 Subspecies: Prioneris thestylis thestylis (Himalayan spotted sawtooth)

Tribe: Teracolini

Genus: Ixias

Species: Ixias pyrene (yellow orange-tip) 
 Subspecies: Ixias pyrene familiaris (east Himalayan yellow orange-tip)

Family: Nymphalidae

Subfamily: Apaturinae 
Tribe: Apaturini

Genus: Euripus

Species: Euripus nyctelius (courtesan) 
Subspecies: Euripus nyctelius nyctelius (Sylhet Circe)

Genus: Hestinalis

Species: Hestinalis nama (Circe) 
Subspecies: Hestinalis nama nama (Sylhet courtesan)

Genus: Mimathyma

Species: Mimathyma ambica (Indian purple emperor)

Genus: Rohana (princes)

Species: Rohana parisatis (black prince) 
Subspecies: Rohana parisatis parisatis (Assam black prince)

Subfamily: Biblidinae 
Tribe: Danaini

Genus: Ariadne (castors)

Species: Ariadne ariadne (angled castor) 
Subspecies: Ariadne ariadne indica (Indian angled castor)

Species: Ariadne merione (common castor) 
Subspecies: Ariadne merione tapestrina (intricate common castor)

Subfamily: Charaxinae

Genus: Charaxes (rajahs and nawabs)

Species: Charaxes arja (pallid nawab) 
Subspecies: Charaxes arja arja (Bengal pallid nawab)

Species: Charaxes bernardus (tawny rajah) 
Subspecies: Charaxes bernardus hierax (variable tawny rajah)

Charaxes athamas (common nawab)

Species: Charaxes eudamippus (great nawab) 
Subspecies: Charaxes eudamippus eudamippus (Himalayan great nawab)

Species: Charaxes marmax (yellow rajah) 
Subspecies: Charaxes marmax marmax (Sylhet yellow rajah)

Species: Charaxes solon (black rajah) 
Subspecies: Charaxes solon solon (pale black rajah)

Subfamily: Cyrestinae

Genus: Cyrestis (maps)

Species: Cyrestis thyodamas (map butterfly) 
Subspecies: Cyrestis thyodamas thyodamas (Oriental map butterfly)

Subfamily: Danainae 
Tribe: Danaini

Genus: Danaus

Species: Danaus chrysippus (plain tiger) 
Subspecies: Danaus chrysippus chrysippus (Oriental plain tiger)

Species: Danaus genutia (striped tiger) 
Subspecies: Danaus genutia genutia (Oriental striped tiger)

Species: Euploea klugii (king crow) 
Subspecies: Euploea klugii kollari (brown king crow)

Species: Euploea radamanthus (magpie crow) 
Subspecies: Euploea radamanthus radamanthus (Oriental magpie crow)

Species: Euploea sylvester (magpie crow) 
Subspecies: Euploea sylvester hopei (Cachar double-branded blue crow)

Species: Euploea mulciber (striped blue crow) 
Subspecies: Euploea mulciber mulciber (Bengal striped blue crow)

Genus: Parantica

Species: Parantica aglea (glassy tiger) 
Subspecies: Parantica aglea melanoides (Himalayan glassy tiger)

Species: Parantica melaneus (chocolate tiger) 
Subspecies: Parantica melaneus plataniston (Himalayan chocolate tiger)

Genus: Tirumala

Species: Tirumala limniace (blue tiger) 
Subspecies: Tirumala limniace exoticus (Oriental blue tiger)

Species: Tirumala septentrionis (dark blue tiger) 
Subspecies: Tirumala septentrionis septentrionis (Oriental dark blue tiger)

Subfamily: Heliconiinae 
Tribe: Acraeini

Genus: Acraea

Species: Acraea terpsicore (tawny coster)

Genus: Cethosia

Species: Cethosia biblis (red lacewing) 
Subspecies: Cethosia biblis tisamena (Himalayan red lacewing)

Species: Cethosia cyane (leopard lacewing) 
Subspecies: Cethosia cyane cyane (Bengal leopard lacewing)

Tribe: Argynnini

Genus: Argynnis

Species: Argynnis hyperbius (tropical fritillary) 
Subspecies: Argynnis hyperbius hyperbius (Chinese tropical fritillary)

Tribe: Vagrantini

Genus: Cirrochroa

Species: Cirrochroa aoris (large yeoman) 
Subspecies: Cirrochroa aoris aoris (Himalayan large yeoman)

Species: Cirrochroa tyche (common yeoman) 
Subspecies: Cirrochroa tyche mithila (Bengal common yeoman)

Genus: Phalanta

Species: Phalanta phalantha (common leopard) 
Subspecies: Phalanta phalantha phalantha (Oriental common leopard)

Genus: Vagrans

Species: Vagrans egista (vagrant) 
Subspecies: Vagrans egista sinha (Himalayan vagrant)

Genus: Vindula

Species: Vindula erota (cruiser) 
Subspecies: Vindula erota erota (Thai cruiser)

Subfamily: Limenitidinae 
Tribe: Adoliadini

Genus: Euthalia

Species: Euthalia lubentina (gaudy baron) 
Subspecies: Euthalia lubentina lubentina (Chinese gaudy baron)

Species: Euthalia monina (powdered baron) 
Subspecies: Euthalia monina kesava (Assam powdered baron)

Species: Euthalia phemius (white-edged blue baron) 
Subspecies: Euthalia phemius phemius (Sylhet white-edged blue baron)

Genus: Symphaedra

Species: Symphaedra nais (baronet)

Genus: Tanaecia

Species: Tanaecia jahnu (plain earl) 
Subspecies: Tanaecia jahnu jahnu (Darjeeling plain earl)

Species: Tanaecia julii (common earl) 
Subspecies: Tanaecia julii appiades (changeable common earl)

Species: Tanaecia lepidea (grey count) 
Subspecies: Tanaecia lepidea lepidea (Himalayan grey count)

Tribe: Limenitidini

Genus: Athyma

Species: Athyma cama (orange staff sergeant) 
Subspecies: Athyma cama cama (Himalayan orange staff sergeant)

Species: Athyma inara (colour sergeant) 
Subspecies: Athyma inara inara (Himalayan colour sergeant)

Genus: Auzakia

Species: Auzakia danava (commodore) 
Subspecies: Auzakia danava danava (Indian commodore)

Genus: Lebadea

Species: Lebadea martha (knight) 
Subspecies: Lebadea martha martha (Thai knight)

Genus: Moduza

Species: Moduza procris (commander) 
Subspecies: Moduza procris procris (Oriental commander)

Genus: Parasarpa

Species: Parasarpa dudu (white commodore) 
Subspecies: Parasarpa dudu dudu (Sylhet white commodore)

Tribe: Neptini

Genus: Lasippa

Species: Lasippa viraja (yellowjack sailer) 
Subspecies: Lasippa viraja viraja (Bengal yellowjack sailer)

Genus: Neptis

Species: Neptis hylas (common sailer) 
Subspecies: Neptis hylas varmona (Indian common sailer)

Species: Neptis zaida (pale green sailer) 
Subspecies: Neptis zaida bhutanica (east Himalayan pale green sailer)

Genus: Pantoporia

Species: Pantoporia hordonia (common lascar) 
Subspecies: Pantoporia hordonia hordonia (Oriental common lascar)

Subfamily: Nymphalinae 
Tribe: Junoniini

Genus: Hypolimnas

Species: Hypolimnas bolina (great eggfly) 
Subspecies: Hypolimnas bolina jacintha (Oriental great eggfly)

Genus: Junonia

Species: Junonia almana (peacock pansy) 
Subspecies: Junonia almana almana (Oriental peacock pansy)

Species: Junonia atlites (grey pansy) 
Subspecies: Junonia atlites atlites (Oriental grey pansy)

Species: Junonia hierta (yellow pansy) 
Subspecies: Junonia hierta hierta (Oriental yellow pansy)

Species: Junonia iphita (chocolate pansy) 
Subspecies: Junonia iphita iphita (Oriental chocolate pansy)

Species: Junonia lemonias (lemon pansy) 
Subspecies: Junonia lemonias lemonias (Chinese lemon pansy)

Species: Junonia orithya (blue pansy) 
Subspecies: Junonia orithya ocyale (dark blue pansy)

Tribe: Kallimini

Genus: Doleschallia

Species: Doleschallia bisaltide (autumn leaf) 
Subspecies: Doleschallia bisaltide indica (Himalayan autumn leaf)

Genus: Kallima

Species: Kallima inachus (orange oakleaf) 
Subspecies: Kallima inachus inachus (Himalayan orange oakleaf)

Tribe: Nymphalini

Genus: Aglais

Species: Aglais caschmirensis (Indian tortoiseshell) 
Subspecies: Aglais caschmirensis aesis (Himalayan tortoiseshell)

Genus: Symbrenthia

Species: Symbrenthia lilaea (northern common jester) 
Subspecies: Symbrenthia lilaea khasiana (Khasi common mester)

Genus: Vanessa

Species: Vanessa cardui (painted lady)

Species: Vanessa indica (Indian red admiral) 
Subspecies: Vanessa indica indica (Himalayan red admiral)

Subfamily: Pseudergolinae 
Tribe: Pseudergolini

Genus: Pseudergolis

Species: Pseudergolis wedah (tabby) 
Subspecies: Pseudergolis wedah wedah (Himalayan tabby)

Genus: Stibochiona

Species: Stibochiona nicea (popinjay) 
Subspecies: Stibochiona nicea nicea (Himalayan popinjay)

Subfamily: Satyrinae 
Tribe: Elymniini

Genus: Elymnias

Species: Elymnias hypermnestra (common palmfly) 
Subspecies: Elymnias hypermnestra undularis (wavy common palmfly)

Species: Elymnias malelas (spotted palmfly) 
Subspecies: Elymnias malelas malelas (Bengal spotted palmfly)

Species: Elymnias vasudeva (Jezebel palmfly) 

Tribe: Melanitini

Genus: Melanitis

Species: Melanitis leda (common evening brown) 
Subspecies: Melanitis leda leda (Oriental common evening brown)

Tribe: Satyrini

Genus: Lethe

Species: Lethe chandica (angled red forester) 
Subspecies: Lethe chandica chandica (Darjeeling angled red forester)

Species: Lethe confusa (banded treebrown) 
Subspecies: Lethe confusa confusa (Himalayan banded treebrown)

Genus: Mycalesis

Species: Mycalesis anaxias (white-bar bushbrown) 
Subspecies: Mycalesis anaxias aemate (Indo-Chinese white-bar bushbrown)

Species: Mycalesis malsara (white-line bushbrown)

Genus: Ypthima

Species: Ypthima baldus (common five-ring) 
Subspecies: Ypthima baldus baldus (Himalayan common five-ring)

Species: Ypthima huebneri (common four-ring)

Family: Lycaenidae

Subfamily: Curetinae

Genus: Curetis

Species: Curetis acuta (acute sunbeam) 
Subspecies: Curetis acuta dentata (Indian acute sunbeam)

Species: Curetis bulis (bright sunbeam) 
Subspecies: Curetis bulis bulis (Himalayan bright sunbeam)

Species: Curetis thetis (Indian sunbeam)

Subfamily: Lycaeninae

Genus: Heliophorus

Species: Heliophorus brahma (golden sapphire) 
Subspecies: Heliophorus brahma brahma (Himalayan golden sapphire)

Subfamily: Polyommatinae 
Tribe: Lycaenesthini

Genus: Anthene

Species: Anthene emolus (common ciliate blue) 
Subspecies: Anthene emolus emolus (Bengal common ciliate blue)

Tribe: Polyommatini

Genus: Acytolepis

Species: Acytolepis puspa (common hedge blue) 
Subspecies: Acytolepis puspa gisca (Himalayan common hedge blue)

Genus: Caleta

Species: Caleta elna (elbowed Pierrot) 
Subspecies: Caleta elna noliteia (Indo-Chinese elbowed Pierrot)

Genus: Castalius

Species: Castalius rosimon (common Pierrot) 
Subspecies: Castalius rosimon rosimon (Continental common Pierrot)

Genus: Catochrysops

Species: Catochrysops panormus (silver forget-me-not) 
Subspecies: Catochrysops panormus exiguus (Malay silver forget-me-not)

Species: Catochrysops strabo (forget-me-not) 
Subspecies: Catochrysops strabo strabo (Oriental forget-me-not)

Genus: Luthrodes

Species: Luthrodes pandava (plains Cupid) 
Subspecies: Luthrodes pandava pandava (Oriental plains Cupid)

Genus: Everes

Species: Everes lacturnus (Oriental Cupid) 
Subspecies: Everes lacturnus syntala (Dakhan Cupid)

Genus: Jamides

Species: Jamides bochus (dark cerulean) 
Subspecies: Jamides bochus bochus (Indian dark cerulean)

Species: Jamides celeno (common cerulean) 
Subspecies: Jamides celeno celeno (Oriental common cerulean)

Genus: Leptotes

Species: Leptotes plinius (zebra blue) 
Subspecies: Leptotes plinius plinius (Asian zebra blue)

Genus: Neopithecops

Species: Neopithecops zalmora (common Quaker) 
Subspecies: Neopithecops zalmora zalmora (Myanmar common Quaker)

Genus: Prosotas

Species: Prosotas dubiosa (tailless lineblue) 
Subspecies: Prosotas dubiosa indica (Indian tailless lineblue)

Species: Prosotas nora (common lineblue) 
Subspecies: Prosotas nora ardates (Indian common lineblue)

Genus: Pseudozizeeria

Species: Pseudozizeeria maha (pale grass blue) 
Subspecies: Pseudozizeeria maha maha (Himalayan pale grass blue)

Genus: Zizeeria

Species: Zizeeria karsandra (dark grass blue)

Genus: Zizina

Species: Zizina otis (lesser grass blue) 
Subspecies: Zizina otis otis (Oriental lesser grass blue)

Subfamily: Poritiinae 
Tribe: Poritiini

Genus: Poritia

Species: Poritia hewitsoni (common gem) 
Subspecies: Poritia hewitsoni hewitsoni (Himalayan common gem)

Subfamily: Theclinae 
Tribe: Amblypodiini

Genus: Amblypodia

Species: Amblypodia anita (purple leaf blue) 
Subspecies: Amblypodia anita dina (Indian purple leaf blue)

Genus: Iraota

Species: Iraota rochana (scarce silverstreak blue) 
Subspecies: Iraota rochana boswelliana (Malayan scarce silverstreak blue)

Tribe: Arhopalini

Genus: Arhopala

Species: Arhopala abseus (aberrant oakblue) 
Subspecies: Arhopala abseus indicus (Indian aberrant oakblue)

Species: Arhopala atrax (Indian oakblue)

Species: Arhopala bazalus (powdered oakblue) 
Subspecies: Arhopala bazalus teesta (Teesta powdered oakblue)

Species: Arhopala centaurus (centaur oakblue) 
Subspecies: Arhopala centaurus pirithous (Bengal centaur oakblue)

Genus: Flos

Species: Flos adriana (variegated plushblue)

Species: Flos areste (tailless plushblue)

Genus: Surendra

Species: Surendra quercetorum (common acacia blue) 
Subspecies: Surendra quercetorum quercetorum (Himalayan common acacia blue)

Tribe: Catapaecilmini

Genus: Catapaecilma

Species: Catapaecilma major (common tinsel) 
Subspecies: Catapaecilma major major (Himalayan common tinsel)

Tribe: Cheritrini

Genus: Cheritra

Species: Cheritra freja (common imperial) 
Subspecies: Cheritra freja evansi (Khasi common imperial)

Genus: Ticherra

Species: Ticherra acte (blue imperial) 
Subspecies: Ticherra acte acte (Himalayan blue imperial)

Tribe: Deudorigini

Genus: Rapala

Species: Rapala iarbus (common red flash) 
Subspecies: Rapala iarbus iarbus (Oriental red flash)

Species: Rapala pheretima (copper flash) 
Subspecies: Rapala pheretima petosiris (Indian copper flash)

Genus: Virachola

Species: Virachola perse (large guava blue) 
Subspecies: Virachola perse perse (Himalayan large guava blue)

Tribe: Iolaini

Genus: Creon

Species: Creon cleobis (broad-tail royal) 
Subspecies: Creon cleobis cleobis (Bengal broad-tail royal)

Tribe: Horagini

Genus: Horaga

Species: Horaga onyx (common onyx) 
Subspecies: Horaga onyx onyx (variable common onyx)

Genus: Rathinda

Species: Rathinda amor (monkey puzzle) 

Tribe: Hypolycaenini

Genus: Hypolycaena

Species: Hypolycaena erylus (common tit) 
Subspecies: Hypolycaena erylus himavantus (Sikkim common tit)

Species: Hypolycaena othona (orchid tit) 
Subspecies: Hypolycaena othona othona (Oriental orchid tit)

Genus: Zeltus

Species: Zeltus amasa (fluffy tit) 
Subspecies: Zeltus amasa amasa (Indian fluffy tit)

Tribe: Remelanini

Genus: Ancema

Species: Ancema blanka (silver royal) 
Subspecies: Ancema blanka minturna (blue-streaked silver royal)

Genus: Remelana

Species: Remelana jangala (chocolate royal) 
Subspecies: Remelana jangala ravata (northern chocolate royal)

Family: Riodinidae

Subfamily: Nemeobiinae 
Tribe: Abisarini

Genus: Abisara

Species: Abisara bifasciata (double-banded Judy)
Subspecies: Abisara bifasciata angulata (angled double-banded Judy)

Species: Abisara echerius (plum Judy)

Species: Abisara fylla (dark Judy) 

Tribe: Nemeobiini

Genus: Dodona

Species: Dodona dipoea (lesser Punch) 
Subspecies: Dodona dipoea dipoea (Himalayan lesser Punch)

Species: Dodona egeon (orange Punch) 
Subspecies: Dodona egeon egeon (Himalayan orange Punch)

Genus: Zemeros

Species: Zemeros flegyas (Punchinello) 
Subspecies: Zemeros flegyas flegyas (Himalayan Punchinello)

Family: Hesperiidae

Subfamily: Coeliadinae

Genus: Badamia

Species: Badamia exclamationis (brown awl)

Genus: Bibasis

Species: Bibasis sena (orangetail awl)
Subspecies: Bibasis sena sena (Indian orangetail awl)

Genus: Choaspes

Species: Choaspes benjaminii (common awlking) 
Subspecies: Choaspes benjaminii japonica (Oriental common awlking)

Species: Choaspes furcata (hooked awlking)

Genus: Hasora

Species: Hasora badra (common awl)
Subspecies: Hasora badra badra (Oriental common awl)

Subfamily: Hesperiinae 
Tribe: Aeromachini

Genus: Matapa

Species: Matapa aria (common branded redeye or common redeye)

Genus: Ochus

Species: Ochus subvittatus (tiger hopper) 
Subspecies: Ochus subvittatus subradiatus (Khasi tiger hopper)

Genus: Suastus

Species: Suastus gremius (Oriental palm bob) 

Subspecies: Suastus gremius gremius ( Indian palm bob)

Genus: Udaspes

Species: Udaspes folus (grass demon)

Genus: Zographetus

Species: Zographetus ogygia (purple-spotted flitter) 
Subspecies: Zographetus ogygia ogygia (continental purple-spotted flitter)

Tribe: Erionotini

Genus: Ancistroides

Species: Ancistroides nigrita (chocolate demon) 
Subspecies: Ancistroides nigrita diocles (Bengal chocolate demon)

Genus: Arnetta

Species: Arnetta atkinsoni (black-tufted bob or Atkinson's bob)

Genus: Iambrix

Species: Iambrix salsala (chestnut bob)
Subspecies: Iambrix salsala salsala (eastern chestnut bob)

Tribe: Baorini

Genus: Borbo

Species: Borbo bevani (lesser rice swift or Bevan's swift)

Subfamily: Pyrginae 
Tribe: Carcharodini

Genus: Spialia

Species: Spialia galba (Indian grizzled skipper) 

Tribe: Celaenorrhinini

Genus: Celaenorrhinus

Species: Celaenorrhinus putra (restricted spotted flat) 
Subspecies: Celaenorrhinus putra putra (Bengal restricted spotted flat)

Genus: Pseudocoladenia

Species: Pseudocoladenia dan (fulvous pied flat) 
Subspecies: Pseudocoladenia dan fabia (Himalayan fulvous pied flat)

Genus: Sarangesa

Species: Sarangesa dasahara (common small flat) 
Subspecies: Sarangesa dasahara dasahara (Indian common small flat)

Tribe: Tagiadini

Genus: Caprona

Species: Caprona ransonnetii (golden angle) 
Subspecies: Caprona ransonnetii potiphera (Dakhan golden angle)

Genus: Coladenia

Species: Coladenia agni (brown pied flat) 
Subspecies: Coladenia agni agni (Himalayan brown pied flat)

Genus: Ctenoptilum

Species: Ctenoptilum vasava (tawny angle) 
Subspecies: Ctenoptilum vasava vasava (Himalayan tawny angle)

Genus: Gerosis

Species: Gerosis phisara (dusky yellow-breast flat) 
Subspecies: Gerosis phisara phisara (Khasi dusky yellow-breast flat)

Genus: Mooreana

Species: Mooreana trichoneura (yellow flat) 
Subspecies: Mooreana trichoneura pralaya (yellow-veined flat)

Genus: Odontoptilum

Species: Odontoptilum angulata (chestnut angle) 
Subspecies: Odontoptilum angulata angulata (Oriental chestnut angle)

Genus: Seseria

Species: Seseria dohertyi (contiguous seseria) 
Subspecies: Seseria dohertyi dohertyi (Himalayan contiguous seseria or Himalayan white flat)

Species: Seseria sambara (notched seseria) 
Subspecies: Seseria sambara sambara (Himalayan notched seseria or Sikkim white flat)

Genus: Tagiades

Species: Tagiades japetus (common snow flat) 
Subspecies: Tagiades japetus ravi (Himalayan common snow flat)

See also

 Butterfly
 List of butterflies of India

References

Butterflies of India
India Biodiversity Portal
Fauna of British India. Butterflies 1 by Talbot G
Fauna of British India. Butterflies 2 by Talbot G.

Lists of butterflies of India
Lepidoptera of India